Karl or Carl Ludwig may refer to:

 Charles I Louis, Elector Palatine (1617–1680)
 Karl Ludwig, Prince of Hohenlohe-Langenburg (1762–1825)
 Archduke Karl Ludwig of Austria (1833–1896)
 Carl Ludwig (1816–1895), German physician and physiologist
 Carl Ludwig (Medal of Honor) (1841–1913), Union Army soldier and Medal of Honor recipient
 Karl Ludwig (footballer) (1886–1948), German footballer
 Archduke Carl Ludwig of Austria (1918–2007)
 Karl Ludwig (sledge hockey) (born 1988), Canadian ice sledge hockey player

See also
 Charles Louis